NDR may refer to:

Computing
 Non delivery report, a return email message to a sender indicating failed message delivery
 Network Data Representation, an implementation of the OSI model presentation layer

Science and technology
 Negative differential resistance
 Naming and Design Rules in metadata
 Neighborhood deformation retract, a kind of topological subspace
 National Data Repository, a system to store data about a nation's natural resources

Others
 Nador International Airport (IATA code name: NDR), airport in Morocco
 National Driver Register, United States
 Norddeutscher Rundfunk, a public radio and television broadcaster in northern Germany
 Norwich Northern Distributor Road or Broadland Northway, a major route around the north of Norwich, England
 Singapore National Day Rally, an annual address that the Prime Minister of Singapore makes to the nation
 Non-invasive disc rehabilitation, NDR Method
 Nash Dom Rossiya (Наш Дом Россия, Our Home Is Russia), Russian political party
 North Diversion Road, which is a nickname to North Luzon Expressway and formerly its official name